Melinda Janki is a Guyanese lawyer. She was instrumental in writing into Guyana's 1995 constitution the Environmental Protection Act giving its citizens among the strongest protections of any nation, including "the right to an environment that is not harmful to his or her health or well-being."

Early career

Janki studied law at Oxford University and University College London and spent part of her early career with British Petroleum. She returned to Guyana in the 1990s to participate in its new democracy and was successful at helping to make its new constitution identify environmental concerns, including a stable climate, as human rights for Guyanese citizens. Later, she served as cochair of the IUCN Commission on Environment and Law, Special Indigenous Peoples Group, where she wrote or cowrote works on topics such as rights-based approaches to using justice systems for environmental conservation and about Guyanese peoples, such as the WaiWai's successful use of Guyana's legal systems to gain fuller ownership of their lands from the government.

ExxonMobil Suits

In 2021, Janki launched the first of multiple suits against the Guyanese government for making an offshore oil-drilling partnership with ExxonMobil not in accordance with Guyana's strong environmental laws. The project is expected to eventually bring in 750,000 to more than one million barrels of oil a day, making Guyana one of the world's top-twenty oil producers and Exxon's single most voluminous source of oil.

Upon discovering oil in 2015, Exxon made a nonpublic deal with Guyanese president David A. Granger for a series of 23-year permits. These contract were revealed to the public i 2017. According to the Institute for Energy Economics and Financial Analysis, by the end of 2021, Exxon and its partners had made $3.6 billion, compared to Guyana’s $607 million and, by 2027, Guyana will owe more than $34 billion to Exxon and its partners.

The suits, however, are plaintiffed by citizens who, for one reason or another, may be negatively affected the drilling or, more generally, climate change as caused by fossil fuels. The third lawsuit states, "The earth’s atmosphere and oceans have been and continue to be polluted by the release and accumulation of greenhouse gases [from] the production, transportation, refining and use of fossil fuels" thus violating Guyana's citizens right to a healthful and sustainable environment. According to Guyanese law, all permits require each involved company to form an environmental impact report and to accept all liability for human and environmental impact.

Exxon has joined the suits as a codefendant, suggesting it feels its business model is potentially threatened by these suits. The suits, if successful, may provide a template for other country's suffering the most immediate risks of climate change to challenge the oil industry's role in effecting the damage.

Janki's first victory was cutting the length of Exxon's contracts from 23 years to five years.

References

Living people
People from Georgetown, Guyana
Environmental lawyers
Year of birth missing (living people)